"We Are Here to Make Some Noise" is an instrumental single by Dutch DJ and record producer Armin van Buuren. The track was released in the Netherlands by Armada Music as a digital download on 9 May 2012.

Background
Van Buuren wrote the piece for the celebration of 2012's Queensday in the Netherlands and in preparation for the UEFA Euro 2012.

Music video
A music video to accompany the track was released to YouTube on 31 May 2012.

Track listing
 Digital download 
 "We Are Here to Make Some Noise" (radio edit) – 3:05
 "We Are Here to Make Some Noise" (extended mix) – 5:12

 Remixes – digital download 
 "We Are Here to Make Some Noise" (Judge Jules remix) – 6:22
 "We Are Here to Make Some Noise" (Judge Jules edit) – 3:06
 "We Are Here to Make Some Noise" (Antillas & Dankann remix) – 6:34
 "We Are Here to Make Some Noise" (Antillas & Dankann edit) – 3:09
 "We Are Here to Make Some Noise" (Maison & Dragen remix) – 6:35
 "We Are Here to Make Some Noise" (Maison & Dragen edit) – 3:30
 "We Are Here to Make Some Noise" (The Scumfrog remix) – 8:07
 "We Are Here to Make Some Noise" (The Scumfrog edit) – 3:25

Charts

References

2012 singles
Armin van Buuren songs
2012 songs
Songs written by Armin van Buuren
Armada Music singles
Songs written by Benno de Goeij